Aluga is an abandoned village near Bajina Bašta, in Zlatibor District, Serbia.

References

Former populated places in Serbia
Zlatibor District